The Flash is an American television series developed by the writing team of Danny Bilson and Paul De Meo that aired on CBS from September 20, 1990 to May 18, 1991. It is based on the DC Comics character Barry Allen / Flash, a costumed superhero crime-fighter with the power to move at superhuman speeds. The Flash starred John Wesley Shipp as Allen, along with Amanda Pays, and Alex Désert.

Multiple references to the series have been made on the 2014 Flash television series, including Shipp portraying multiple characters. Shipp also reprised his role as Barry Allen from this series in the crossover "Elseworlds" and "Crisis on Infinite Earths", which established The Flash as existing on a parallel Earth to the Arrowverse series called Earth-90.

Summary
Barry Allen, a forensic scientist working for the Central City police, is struck by lightning and doused in chemicals in his lab. He develops superspeed and creates a superhero identity for himself to fight crime: The Flash. Research scientist Dr. Tina McGee works at S.T.A.R. Labs and helps Barry fight crime while trying to understand how his powers are developing. As well as his superheroics, Barry tries to maintain a private life, and tries to keep his superhero identity from his colleagues, his boss Lt. Garfield, and his best friend, Julio Mendez.

Cast and characters

Main
 John Wesley Shipp as Barry Allen / Flash: A forensic scientist in the Central City Police Department (CCPD) who gains the power of super speed after his lab is struck by lightning causing him to be doused with chemicals. Shipp also portrayed the Flash's "evil" clone, Pollux.
 Amanda Pays as Christina R. "Tina" McGee: A scientist at S.T.A.R. Labs who provides the Flash with experimental inventions to adapt and overcome his enemies and learn about his powers. She is also a love interest of Barry.
 Alex Désert as Julio Mendez: A Central City Police Department scientist who is Barry Allen's co-worker and close friend.

Recurring
 Richard Belzer as Joe Kline: A WCCN TV news reporter, known as the "Voice of the City". Kline often does tabloid-style news stories about the Flash and his exploits.
 Jason Bernard as Dr. Desmond Powell / Nightshade: A 1950s vigilante who captured criminals using tranquilizer darts. Gave up being a vigilante after he stopped The Ghost in 1955; later became a Doctor and Chief of Staff at Central City Hospital. When the Ghost reappears in 1990, Powell becomes Nightshade once again and teams up with the Flash to apprehend the Ghost. Later unknowingly inspires the Deadly Nightshade; is framed for multiple counts of murder, but clears his name and captures the impostor. Makes his secret identity public and becomes a celebrity.
 Vito D'Ambrosio as Officer Tony Bellows: A CCPD patrol officer, partner of Murphy; in the early episodes, Bellows notices whenever the Flash appears, Murphy is never around. Bellows accuses Murphy of being the Flash, until he sees Murphy and the Flash at the same time.
 Biff Manard as Officer Michael Francis Murphy: A CCPD patrol officer, partner of Bellows; does not believe the Flash is real because he has never witnessed the Flash (until he saw the Flash save hostages trapped inside a frozen bus, courtesy of Captain Cold). Murphy has served the CCPD for many years and is considering retiring to a job where he does not get shot at all the time.
 Mike Genovese as Lt. Warren Garfield: A Lieutenant, CCPD; Barry & Julio's supervisor. Despite his gruff demeanor, Garfield actually cares for his men. It was Lt. Garfield who deduced the true identity of the Nightshade, Dr. Desmond Powell, who has been a friend of Garfield for more than 30 years.
 Mark Hamill as James Montgomery Jesse / The Trickster: A psychopath and delusional mass murderer with multiple personalities, and a con artist. Wanted for murder in six states. Obsessed with Megan Lockhart and kidnaps her to be his fantasy sidekick, Prank. Believing that Megan is under the influence of the Flash, the Trickster challenges him in order to be rid of his "evil spell". However, the Trickster fails and is arrested. He is put on trial & awaiting his verdict, when he is freed by Zoey Clark, who becomes the second Prank. As revenge, the Trickster captures the Flash and brainwashes him to do his bidding. The Trickster wreaks havoc upon Central City and puts the entire city on trial with the aid of his new partner. The Flash overcomes his programming and turns the tables on the Trickster, who is sent to a padded cell.
 Joyce Hyser as Megan Lockhart / Prank (1st): A private investigator and repossession agent; she deduced the Flash's Identity for a corrupt D.A., who would later blackmail the Flash. Opposed to what the Flash was working for until she witnessed him save someone she was spying on, and helped to put an end to the scheme of the corrupt D.A. She later becomes the Trickster's unwilling sidekick, Prank. Later helps Tina McGee stop the Trickster (fed up with the Trickster's antics, Megan punches and knocks out the Trickster) and the brainwashed Flash. Also becomes another one of Barry Allen's love interests.
 M. Emmet Walsh as Henry Allen: A sergeant, CCPD (retired); father of Barry and Jay Allen. Inspired his sons to join the police force, though his relationship with Barry is partially estranged. Henry is also a supporter of the Flash.
 Dick Miller as Fosnight: A police informant who provides Barry Allen with tips on criminals. Fosnight owes a "life debt" to Henry Allen, and extended that debt to his two sons as well. Was originally arrested by the first Nightshade and is the first person to believe his innocence.
 Priscilla Pointer as Nora Allen: The mother of Barry and Jay Allen; volunteer at a shelter for single mothers.
 Gloria Reuben as Sabrina: Julio's girlfriend. Constantly trying to set up Barry with blind dates, and constantly breaking up and getting back together with Julio.
 Robert Shayne as Reg the News Stand Vendor: Reg was the owner of a news stand whom Barry Allen buys his daily newspaper from. Also offers Barry occasional advice & information on underworld activities.
 Michael Nader as Nicholas Pike: A disgraced former CCPD patrol officer who became the leader of the Dark Riders biker gang; in revenge, Pike murders Barry Allen's brother Jay Allen, who was once Pike's partner and the person who turned Pike in for corruption. Pike is captured by the Flash and put on trial, but is released on a technicality. Pike tries to kill the Flash, but his plan backfires and Pike is arrested again. In an alternate future timeline, Pike becomes the fascist Mayor of Central City, but is again defeated by the Flash before the hero returns to the present to avert Pike's younger counterpart's attempt for power.

Guest stars
 Corinne Bohrer as Zoey Clark / Prank (2nd): The owner of Clarx Toys and a huge fan of the Trickster. Her obsession leads her to free him during his trial. Originally, the Trickster intends to recreate his criminal life but Zoey seduces him back to his Trickster self and becomes the Trickster's true sidekick, Prank, which is what she always wanted. Prank uses her wealth to finance the Trickster's evil schemes, including the brainwashing of the Flash. The corrupted Flash becomes the Trickster's favored sidekick and she is locked and tied up in her own toy store for complaining about it. Despite her best efforts, the Trickster has lost interest in Prank and ultimately boots her out of the getaway truck that they are in, resulting in Prank's arrest.
 Richard Burgi as Curtis Bohannan / Deadly Nightshade: A philanthropist and son of mob boss Derek Bohannan, an enemy of Nightshade; decides to atone for his father's sins by becoming a vigilante resembling Nightshade, except the Deadly Nightshade wears red-glowing goggles and uses real bullets. The Deadly Nightshade guns down a terrorist group and several of Derek Bohannan's former mob associates before the Flash confronts him. Due to their similar appearances, the real Nightshade is framed for the murders. Using his wealth, Bohannan builds a high-tech lair inside his mansion and an advanced cybernetic exoskeleton, which gives Bohannan super-speed similar to the Flash. The Flash then attempts to apprehend him, but is nearly overwhelmed by the exoskeleton and an injury he sustained earlier in the leg, but then it is Bohannan who is then tranquilized by the original Nightshade and arrested by the police.
 David Cassidy as Sam Scudder / Mirror Master: A professional thief who is an expert with mirrors and holography; steals a crystal from S.T.A.R. Labs and attempts to kill his ex-partner Stasia Masters, a high school girlfriend of Barry Allen. The Flash (with help from Tina) uses a high-powered spotlight to blind Scudder and drown out his illusions, allowing the Flash to capture him.
 Michael Champion as Leonard Wynters / Captain Cold: An infamous albino hitman known for freezing his victims to death with a nuclear-powered freeze gun. Captured by the Flash and arrested by CCPD pending trial, but later escapes using concealed freeze weapons. Seemingly killed by his own freeze ray when the Flash deflects the ray back at him.
 Jeffrey Combs as Jimmy Swain: A mob boss who hires Captain Cold to eliminate his enemies, including the Flash. Since Captain Cold initially failed to kill the Flash, Swain refuses to pay Cold, who kills Swain with a freeze bomb and takes his fee out of a twisted sense of honor.
 Denise Crosby as Dr. Rebecca Frost: A psychologist specializing in psychoanalyzing masked vigilantes such as the Flash, assigned to be Felicia Kane's psychiatrist after the Deadly Nightshade rescued her. Went out on one date with Barry Allen.
 Paula Marshall as Iris West: A computer graphics artist who is dating Barry Allen at the time he is transformed into the Flash without her knowledge. Barry wants to marry Iris, but she refuses, feeling that their relationship is moving too fast, and they break up. Iris later moves to Paris in order to make a new start in her life. She sends a postcard to Barry in the second episode, but Barry's interest subsided, so Julio burns it to help Barry move on with his life. Even though Barry puts Iris behind him, he still keeps a family picture with her in it that they took during his brother's birthday party. Marshall was credited as a principal character for the pilot episode, but was subsequently written out of the show with the second episode.
 Bill Mumy as Roger Braintree: An eccentric but brilliant scientist who creates a sound wave device capable of putting its targets into a deep slumber. Braintree's cousin, small-time hoodlum Harry Milgrim, steals the device and uses it in a crime spree until he is caught by the Flash.
 Christopher Neame as Dr. Brian Gideon: Former S.T.A.R. Labs scientist with a grudge towards the company after an accidental gas killed hundreds. Months later, Gideon using an invisibility belt, sought to poison Central City but stopped by Flash short-circuiting out his device, killing him.
 Lois Nettleton as Belle Crocker / The Ghostess: The Ghost's sidekick and girlfriend; is saved by the Nightshade after their hideout catches on fire. Thinking the Ghost has died, she gives up the life of crime and becomes a lounge singer. Thirty-five years later, she learns that the Ghost survived the fire and has not aged. While she initially welcomes him back into her life, she cannot handle the fact that he is still a young man and eventually leaves him, informing Nightshade of the Ghost's location.
Sherrie Rose as Young Belle Crocker
 Jeri Ryan as Felicia Kane: A wealthy heiress kidnapped and held for ransom by pro-Guevara Marxist revolutionaries; rescued by the Deadly Nightshade, who ruthlessly guns down Kane's kidnappers, then freed by the Flash. Severely traumatized by her ordeal, Kane's testimony clears the wrongly accused Flash of any wrongdoing, but puts the Original Nightshade inadvertently in the wrong light.
 Anthony Starke as Russell / The Ghost: A megalomaniacal extortionist and electronics expert who uses television to eavesdrop on his victims and broadcast his demands. In 1955, Nightshade attempts to capture the Ghost, who threatened to blow up downtown Central City if he was not paid $1 million by the Mayor, but the Ghost fakes his death and seals himself in a "freeze chamber", set to awaken the Ghost in 1999. The equipment malfunctions and thaws out the Ghost in 1990; the Ghost and his crew steal electronics from a TV charity telethon and S.T.A.R. Labs, then the Ghost connects himself to his computers & threatens to shut down Central City's computer network, communications and power grid if he is not paid a $1 billion ransom, but he is captured by the Flash and Nightshade. The Ghost's mind is trapped in cyberspace, with his body left in a catatonic state.
 Tim Thomerson as Jay Allen: The older brother of Barry Allen and head of the CCPD Motorcycle Patrol Division. He is killed by his former police partner, Nicholas Pike. His first name is a nod to Jay Garrick.
 Mariko Tse as Linda Park: A Central City news reporter, asking the Central City police department about their response in dealing with all the gang attacks in the city.
 Christopher Neame as Marcos Trachmann:  Trachmann is a former mind control researcher working for drug lord Reuben Calderon, who sought to control Flash to distract away from crimes. He is later immobilized by Flash hotwiring out his equipment and placed in police custody.
Other guest stars in minor roles include Jonathan Brandis as Terry Cohan, Bryan Cranston as Phillip Moses, Mark Dacascos as Osako, Robert O'Reilly as Victor Kelso, and Sven-Ole Thorsen as the android assassin Omega. Thorsen also portrayed Carl Tanner in his monster form.

Production 
Development for the series began in 1988 when Warner Bros. Television tried to develop television films based on some DC Comics characters for CBS. Danny Bilson and Paul De Meo conceived one that featured several superheroes, including the Flash, though their project was not made. In January 1990, new CBS Entertainment president Jeff Sagansky expressed interest in creating a series featuring the Flash, and The Flash was announced a few months after.

Bilson and De Meo were tapped to write the pilot episode, which they completed in January 1990. Filming for the episode took six weeks, from May through June 1990. The final effects for the pilot were completed a week before airing in September 1990. Bilson said, "There are 125 special effects. It's done on a grand scale." The 2-hour pilot cost $6 million, and each subsequent episode of The Flash cost around $1.6 million to produce.

Costumes
The four Flash suits made for the series for John Wesley Shipp cost a total of $100,000. On the suit, De Meo said, "John had to have his entire body cast. The suit is made out of latex. It was quite a process getting it." Bilson added, "The suit was critical. You can't, after Batman, have a guy running around in tights." The Flash's costume was designed by Dave Stevens, who removed the yellow boots, muted the redness, changed the yellow trim to gold and added refined art deco bolts on the temples. Robert Short was tasked with supervising its fabrication and they were built by Stan Winston Studios. Short said the latex suits were specially treated to disguise their rubber surface so they would look like basic stretch unitards, and Shipp wore a water-cooled undergarment to combat the heat of the suits. Bob Miller, costumer on the series, gave Amanda Pays "unaggressive clothing" though she is "an aggressive career woman," with retro 1930s and '40s long tapered skirts, pleated slacks and vests.

Music
Danny Elfman composed the series' title theme, and Shirley Walker composed each episode score for a full orchestra. In 2010, a limited-edition two-disc soundtrack was released by La-La Land Records, featuring Elfman's theme and the scores by Walker for the pilot and the episodes "Captain Cold", "The Trickster", "Watching the Detectives", "Ghost in the Machine", "Done With Mirrors", "Fast Forward" and "Trial of the Trickster".

Episodes

Release

Broadcast
The Flash was originally scheduled to debut on CBS in the 8pm (EST) slot on Thursday, to go against The Cosby Show on NBC, in an attempt to attract younger viewers, before Fox moved The Simpsons from Sunday to the Thursday 8 pm slot for the same reason. After debuting on September 20, 1990, at 8 pm, CBS moved the series to 8:30pm with its second episode, in an attempt to broadcast opposite less formidable competition in Fox's Babes, NBC's A Different World and the second half-hour of ABC's Father Dowling Mysteries. The move was done because this was part of CBS' programming realignment that also involves placing Lenny on hiatus, the delay of Sons and Daughters, and the cancellation of another sci-fi show E.A.R.T.H. Force. Eventually, CBS moved the series off Thursdays entirely, moving the show to Saturday nights. Had the show continued, it was revealed the second season would have opened with the Flash's rogues teaming up to take down the hero.

Marketing
Warner Bros. Television and CBS began its promotion of the series in July 1990 during the 1990 NBA All-Star Game. It also had ad campaigns on radio and cable television during "wrestling matches on USA Cable and during [Batman airings] on the Family Channel", as well as ads in The Flash comic book and posters for the series in malls and Kmarts across the country. Four-minute promos of the series aired at all Six Flags amusement parks and a few weeks before the pilot's debut, Warner Bros. flew banners over beaches on both coasts. Describing the marketing, George Schweitzer, senior vice president of communications at the CBS Broadcast Group said, "It's not being sold as a comic book. It's being sold like Batman [the 1989 film] – dark and mysterious and exciting. The promos have a theatrical quality." The pilot debuted on July 15, 1990 at a "big bash" at the Warner Bros. Burbank lot.

Home media 
The Flash was released on DVD in January 2006.

Several episodes were edited as three TV movies and released on VHS:
 The Flash (1990). The 2-hour pilot episode.
 The Flash II: Revenge of the Trickster (1991). Formed by the episodes "The Trickster" and "The Trial of the Trickster"
 The Flash III: Deadly Nightshade (1991). Formed by the episodes "Ghost in the Machine" and "The Deadly Nightshade".

Laser-disc:
 The Flash (1990). The 2-hour pilot episode.

Other media

Comic book 
A comic book tie-in special based on the TV series was published by DC Comics in 1991 titled The Flash TV Special #1, running at 76 pages. It features two stories, one written by John Byrne with art by Javier Saltares, and the second written by then-writer of the ongoing Flash (vol. 2) title, Mark Waid featuring a thief Kid Flash; plus a behind-the-scenes look on the making of the TV series with photos.

Video game 
A video game was released for Game Boy in 1991 by THQ, and was based on the TV series. It was released in the US and had a password system. A second game was programmed by Probe Entertainment and released only in Europe for the Master System in 1993.

Arrowverse

The 2014 television series, The Flash, features several references to the 1990 series. John Wesley Shipp plays the recurring role of Barry Allen's father, Henry Allen, and Amanda Pays once again portrays a character named Dr. Tina McGee. Shipp eventually portrays the Earth-3 version of Henry Allen, Jay Garrick / Flash. Regarding the difference in his portrayal of Garrick over Allen, Shipp "figured Jay is my version of Barry" from the 1990 series, adding, "I went back and I watched a couple of episodes of the 1990/91 version to kind of remind myself what I did. [Jay] is much more reminiscent of my Barry Allen from 25 years ago than my Henry Allen. I went back and I was amazed how much attitude my Barry Allen had in some situations. I went back and I picked up that thread and I brought it forward 25 years, and tried to weave it in." In "Welcome to Earth-2", as Barry, Cisco Ramon and Harry Wells are traveling to Earth-2, glimpses of the multiverse are seen, including an image of Shipp as the Flash from the 1990 series, implying that the series was retroactively being added to the Arrowverse-multiverse.

In the episode "Tricksters", Mark Hamill returns as James Jesse / Trickster, with images of Hamill as Trickster from the 1990 TV series being used in a police report, and Vito D'Ambrosio plays Mayor Anthony Bellows; a variation of a police officer character he played in 1991, though a later episode revealed Mayor Bellows was formerly an officer. 2014 series composer Blake Neely incorporated Walker's theme for the Trickster into the episode. Alex Désert reprises the role of Julio Mendez in the series' third-season episode, "Flashpoint", where he is the captain of the Central City Police Department in the Flashpoint timeline. Corinne Bohrer reprises her role as Zoey Clark / Prank in the fourth season episode, "The Elongated Knight Rises," which also featured stills of her from the 1990 show in her police file.

Shipp reprises his role as Barry Allen from this series in the 2018 Arrowverse crossover, "Elseworlds". The crossover also links the 1990 series to the Arrowverse, designating its world as Earth-90. Danny Elfman's theme accompanied the Earth-90 Flash's appearance into the episodes. He attempts to warn the heroes of Earth-1 about Mar Novu / The Monitor to prevent a similar devastation that his own world suffered before Novu breaches him away. The character reappears in the following year's crossover, "Crisis on Infinite Earths", having been captured by the Anti-Monitor and forced to power his anti-matter cannon to destroy the multiverse. Despite being freed by Earth-1 Flash and his allies, he ultimately sacrifices himself to destroy the machine, seeing his life with Tina (whom he had married at some point) flash before his eyes in the form of a clip from the original series' pilot episode. After the filming of the scene, Shipp told The Flash showrunner Eric Wallace, "Thank you for giving me this opportunity to close a chapter."

References

External links 
 
 
 
 Episode Guide from SciFi.com
 Crimson Lightning - A blog featuring regular reviews of The Flash television series.
 Interview about the series with lead actor John Wesley Shipp
 Pet Fly Podcast Page Including a downloadable commentary track in which series developers Danny Bilson and Paul De Meo discuss the "Trial of the Trickster" episode
 The TV series on Hyperborea

1990 American television series debuts
1990s American drama television series
1991 American television series endings
Arrowverse television series
CBS original programming
English-language television shows
Flash (comics) television series
Television series by Warner Bros. Television Studios
Television shows set in the United States
American superhero television series